Maire inghean Mhuireadhaich or Mary, daughter of Muireadhach II, Mormaer of Menteith, was Countess of Menteith, successor to her sister Isabella (Iosbail). She inherited the title from her father, and married Walter Bailloch, son of Walter Stewart, 3rd High Steward of Scotland. By the time of the death of Walter Comyn, Lord of Badenoch, jure uxoris Earl of Menteith in 1258, she may have already been married. In 1260, Isabella was arrested, along with her new husband, an English knight called John Russell, for the poisoning of her late husband; by the month of April 1261, Walter and Mary were ruling the province as Count and Countess.

She died before her husband, but the exact year is not known. Her husband may have been alive as late as 1294. They had two sons, Alexander, the next ruler of the province, and John, who captured William Wallace and handed him over to the English.

Bibliography
 Brown, Michael, The Wars of Scotland, 1214-1371, (Edinburgh, 2004)
 Paul, James Balfour, The Scots Peerage, Vol. VI, (Edinburgh, 1909)

13th-century births
13th-century deaths
People from Stirling
Mormaers of Menteith
13th-century mormaers